Captain Marmaduke Cecil Allenby (1873–1932), was a British Royal Navy officer and an English first-class cricketer who played for Hampshire County Cricket Club.  He also played for Devon County Cricket Club on two occasions in the Minor Counties Cricket Championship.

Allenby was born on 30 August 1873. He was commissioned in the Royal Navy. While serving as a lieutenant, he was on 15 September 1902 posted to the protected cruiser HMS Argonaut, serving on the China Station.

He served in World War I, was promoted to captain, and died on 16 April 1932.

References

External links 
 CricketArchive Profile

English cricketers
Hampshire cricketers
1873 births
1932 deaths
Devon cricketers
Royal Navy officers of World War I